Richard Gobet (fl. 1382–1390) was an English politician. He was a Member of Parliament for Devizes.

Life
Gobet was married to Agnes. Circa 1388, Gobet bought 20 acres of land in Rowde, two miles from Devizes, and seems to have resided in the area.

Career
He was elected MP for Devizes in May 1382, 1385, 1386 and January 1390. It is unknown when he died, but there is no record of him being alive after 1390.

References

Year of birth missing
Year of death missing
14th-century births
English MPs May 1382
People from Devizes
English MPs 1385
English MPs 1386
English MPs January 1390